Banjo guitar or banjitar or ganjo (Australia) is a six-string banjo tuned in the standard tuning of a six-string guitar (E2-A2-D3-G3-B3-E4) from lowest to highest strings. The six-string banjo was introduced in the late 19th century. Less widespread than four- and five-string banjos, it was reintroduced in the latter part of the twentieth century with the modern guitar-like tuning.

The six-string "banjo guitar" should not be confused with the five-string banjo (played by Pete Seeger, Earl Scruggs and others), which retains re-entrant banjo tuning with a high-pitched short drone string going halfway up the neck.

The zither banjo has six tuning keys, but also only five strings as the short fifth string goes up a hole  at the 5th fret up a channel under the fingerboard, and through a hole in the headstock to a tuning roller.

Banjo guitar players

Johnny St. Cyr was the first well known player of six string banjo. He used it in Louis Armstrong's Hot Five and Hot Seven, with Jelly Roll Morton, and in his own recordings after World War II. 

A number of musicians have played banjo guitars or guitjos, and one a double-necked guitjo.

 Sylvester Weaver
 Ryan Ross of Panic! at the Disco
 Danny Barker
 Clint Black
 Norman Blake
 Buckethead
 Mark Butler of Claddagh
 Ali Campbell of UB40
 Eric Church
 David Crowder
 Steve Howe
 A.D. Paige (Paige & Fiends)
 Kevin Hall of Concrescence
 Clancy Hayes
 Kevin Hayes of Old Crow Medicine Show
 Papa Charlie Jackson
 Steve James
 Larry LaLonde of Primus
 Harry Manx
 Dave Matthews
 Robert May
 Sam McGee
 John McCutcheon
 Kacey Musgraves
 Harvey Reid
 Django Reinhardt
 Ed Robertson of Barenaked Ladies
 Janet Robin
 Joe Satriani
 Joe Scott of Acoustic Eidolon, ("double-necked guitjo")
 John Sebastian
 Bruce Springsteen
 Jim Stafford
 Taylor Swift
 Taj Mahal
 Keith Urban
 Doc Watson
 Neil Young
 James Taylor
 Steve Martin
 Terri Hendrix

See also
 Banjo mandolin
 Banjo ukulele
 Cümbüş
 Dojo (instrument)

References

Banjo family instruments